David Hansen (born July 26, 1968) is an American playwright, actor, director and arts educator. He is the founder of Dobama's Night Kitchen and co-founder of Guerrilla Theater Company and Bad Epitaph Theater Company.

He is a graduate of Bay Village High School, and holds a degree in Theater from Ohio University.  He is married to writer Toni K. Thayer.  He is currently Education Outreach Associate for Great Lakes Theater.

Awards
 (2021) Sherlock Holmes Meets the Bully of Baker Street: Shubert Fendrich Memorial Playwriting Contest
 (2010) Community Workforce Fellow, Community Partnership for Arts and Culture
 (2006) Spencer Tunick In Cleveland: First Place Use of Sound (with Toni K. Thayer and Dave DeOreo for WCPN) from the Press Club of Cleveland
 (2004) I Hate This: A Play Without the Baby: Excellence in Solo Performance at the New York International Fringe Festival

Published works
(2020) Sherlock Holmes Meets the Bully of Baker Street based on characters by Arthur Conan Doyle published by Pioneer Drama Service
(2018) Red Onion, White Garlic (A Tale of Indonesia) published by YouthPLAYS
(2016) The Secret Adversary adaptation of the novel by Agatha Christie published by YouthPLAYS
(2013) Double Heart (The Courtship of Beatrice and Benedick) published by YouthPLAYS
(2012) The Mysterious Affair at Styles adaptation of the novel by Agatha Christie published by Playscripts Inc.

Other Produced Works
(2021) Savory Taṇhā (sixteen short plays performed by a rotating ensemble) a Zoom play
(2019) The Way I Danced With You (The George Michael Play) 
(2019) About a Ghoul 
(2016) Twelfth Night (As Told By Malvolio) adapted from Shakespeare 
(2015) Rosalynde & The Falcon(2015) The Great Globe Itself(2013) Adventures in Slumberland based on characters by Winsor McCay
(2010) On The Dark Side of Twilight (Evolution of the Vampire)(2009) And Then You Die (How I Ran a Marathon in 26.2 Years)(2003) I Hate This: A Play Without the Baby(1997) The Vampyres10-Minute Plays
(2018) Screen Play(2017) No Cure For Cancer(2015) On the Beam (part of The Cleveland Play House Centennial Plays)
(2015) Tiresias Riddles The Fates(2014) Lombardo(2011) The LadyCollaborations
(2021) 10 Minutes to Midnight: 9 Quirky Plays for the Holidays with Dayshawnda Ash, Melissa Crum, Emma James Dahl, John Dayo-Aliya & Maya Malan-Gonzalez
(2014) Seven Ages with Nina Domingue, Mike Geither, Christine Howey, Anne McEvoy, Michael Oatman & Toni K. Thayer
(2001) The Gulf with Joshua D. Brown, Kelly Elliott, Brian Fox, Margi Herwald, Derek Koger, Leah D. Krauss, Heather N. Stout & Sean Sullivan
(1998) Cole Cuts with David Bell, Suzanne L. Miller & Toni K. Thayer
(1996) This Vicious Cabaret with Erin Myers, Mike Schmidt, Toni K. Thayer & Jenna Weiss
(1993) Mind Your Own Business rotating sketch show, written by ensemble
(1992) You Have the Right to Remain Silent! rotating sketch show, written by ensemble

Performances in plays by contemporary playwrights
Hansen often performs in his own plays, and also has a history of performances in new or recently developed works by notable modern playwrights, including:
(2015) White Rabbit Red Rabbit by Nassim Soleimanpour at Cleveland Public Theatre Pre-Off-Broadway
(2013) 8 by Dustin Lance Black at Cleveland Play House
(2012) The Velocity of Autumn'' by Eric Coble at Beck Center For the Arts Pre-Arena/Broadway

References

External links
David Hansen website
Review of 'I Hate This' in the New York Times
Radio adaptation of 'I Hate This' on WCPN
Audio diary on WCPN about Spencer Tunick

1968 births
20th-century American dramatists and playwrights
American male stage actors
Living people
Ohio University alumni
People from Bay Village, Ohio
Place of birth missing (living people)